The 1994 Akron Zips football team represented Akron University in the 1994 NCAA Division I-A football season as members of the Mid-American Conference. They were led by ninth–year head coach Gerry Faust. The Zips played their home games at the Rubber Bowl in Akron, Ohio. They finished the season with a record of 1–10, 1–8 in MAC play to finish in a tie for ninth place.

After the season, head coach Gerry Faust was relieved of his coaching duties. He finished at Akron with a record of 43–53–3.

Schedule

References

Akron
Akron Zips football seasons
Akron Zips football